The shape of things to come (Spanish: Tiempos futuros) is a 2021 internationally co-produced science fiction drama film directed by Victor Checa (in his directorial debut) and written by Víctor Checa and Victor Huizar. It stars Fernando Bacilio and Lorenzo Molina.

Synopsis 
In a dystopian city that appears to be Lima, Teo (Lorenzo Molina), an eleven-year-old boy, works with his father, Luis (Fernando Bacilio), in a mysterious machine that seeks to generate a deluge in a city where it does not rain. Luis, obsessed with making the machine work, puts the invention at risk in the face of constant embargoes and threats from the authorities. Teo, looking to help his father, gets involved with a gang of young spies led by twin brothers, Raiza and Baca. From this meeting, Teo will live new experiences that will question his father's obsession and reveal the hidden nature of the machine.

Cast 
The actors participating in this film are:

 Fernando Bacilio as Luis
 Lorenzo Molina as Teo
 Jeremi García as Baca
 Paulina Bazán as Raiza
 José Flores as Haya

Release 
The film premiered at the Tallinn Black Nights Film Festival in Estonia on November 12, 2021. within the section Rebels with a cause; A competitive section of the festival where films challenge the boundaries of cinema". It was commercially released on November 17, 2022 in Peruvian theaters.

Awards 
The film and won the Jury Award at the Beijing International Film Festival in the Forward Future section aimed at new directors. On the national circuit, it won the award for best film at the Huanuco film festival  and received a mention from the jury at the Trujillo film festival. It was also part of the 2022 Silk Road International Film Festival. The film has also been shown in the Talento Emergente (Cineteca México), which showcases an outstanding selection of first films from around the world.

References

External links 

 

2021 films
2021 science fiction films
2021 drama films
Peruvian science fiction drama films
Mexican science fiction drama films
Ecuadorian science fiction films
Ecuadorian drama films
Spanish science fiction drama films
German science fiction drama films
Dystopian films
2020s Spanish-language films
2020s Peruvian films
2020s Mexican films
2020s Spanish films
2020s German films
Films set in Peru
Films shot in Peru
Films about father–son relationships
2021 directorial debut films